Green River Reservoir State Park is a 2227 hectare (5,503 acre) state park in Hyde Park, Vermont, on the shore of 653-acre Green River Reservoir.

Activities includes camping, swimming, boating, fishing, picnicking, mountain biking, wildlife watching, and winter sports.

Day use is allowed in limited capacity. Only boats powered by electric motors up to 5 mph and human-powered watercraft are allowed.

The park features 28 remote campsites around the Reservoir, which can be reached only by boat.

The park is undeveloped, with only low-impact recreational use allowed on and around the Reservoir. Parking is very limited.

References

External links
 Official web site

State parks of Vermont
Hyde Park (town), Vermont
Protected areas of Lamoille County, Vermont